Anonymous Athonite (also known in Serbia as Nepoznati Svetogorac; late 14th to mid-15th century) was Isaija the Monk's biographer and one of the many unidentified authors of Medieval works. It is assumed that he wrote "The Life of the Elder Isaiah" (Isaija) in the Russian monastery of St. Panteleimon Monastery on the Holy Mountain (Mount Athos), shortly after the death of Isaiah, since he was well acquainted with various moments of the youth and monastic life of Isaiah, being his contemporary and perhaps his colleague or disciple as well. Another work is attributed to him, the translation of the Books of Kings, in 1415.

See also
Lazarević dynasty
Battle of Kosovo
 Jefimija
 Princess Milica of Serbia
 Stefan Lazarević
 Teodosije
 Danilo II, Serbian Archbishop
 Stefan Dušan
 Elder Siluan
 Teodosije the Hilandarian (1246-1328), one of the most important Serbian writers in the Middle Ages, and the next great Athonite in the Serbian literature of the 13th century.
 Elder Grigorije (fl. 1310-1355), builder of Saint Archangels Monastery
 Antonije Bagaš (fl. 1356-1366), bought and restored the Agiou Pavlou monastery
 Lazar the Hilandarian (fl. 1404), the first known Serbian and Russian watchmaker
 Pachomius the Serb (fl. 1440s-1484), hagiographer of the Russian Church
 Miroslav Gospel
 Gabriel the Hilandarian
 Constantine of Kostenets
 Cyprian, Metropolitan of Kiev and All Rus'
 Gregory Tsamblak
 Isaija the Monk
 Grigorije of Gornjak
 Radoslav's Gospel (Inok of Dalša)
 Rajčin Sudić
 Jakov of Serres
 Romylos of Vidin
 Marko Pećki
 Grigorije Vasilije
 Danilo III (patriarch)
 Isaija the Monk
 Jefrem (patriarch)

References 

  Translated and adapted from Serbian Wikipedia's Nepoznati Svetogorac

14th-century biographers
People associated with St. Panteleimon Monastery